Vent polymerase is a thermostable archean DNA polymerase used for the polymerase chain reaction. It was isolated from the thermophile Thermococcus litoralis.

References 

DNA replication
EC 2.7.7
Polymerase chain reaction